Lee Seung-joo, better known by his stage name Loren (stylized as LØREN), is a South Korean singer, songwriter and producer under The Black Label, and releases music through his own indie label Fire Exit Records. He debuted as a singer in 2020 with his heavy rock track, "Empty Trash". He is also credited as a producer on G-Dragon's 2017 song, "개소리 (BULLSHIT)", and as a lyricist on Blackpink's songs "Pretty Savage", "You Never Know" and "Lovesick Girls" - in which music video he made an appearance.

Early life and education  

Loren was born to a South Korean father, Lee Hae-jin, Naver's founder and Global Investment Officer (GIO), and a South Korean mother, Lee Young-rin. He also has one sister, Lee Yeon-joo.

When Loren was around 5th grade, he moved to Singapore. He studied at the American International School without having a basic knowledge on English. After graduating from high school, he moved to Japan and decided to try to be an EDM producer.

Career

2015–2017: Career begins and contract with The Black Label
Between the ages of 19 and 20, his main goal was to make rap and dubstep beats. Then, he would sent them to people he thought might listen his work. The Black Label was also in this list. In that time they were just starting and they offered Loren to go there and practice as a producer. There they would show him how to design his own music and how to work properly. Then, he went on Seoul's teaming clubs to test his skills with EDM and, via this, he got the chance to work with one of the best-selling artists in Korea, G-Dragon. Now, Loren has a producer credit, under the name cawlr, on one of GD's hits, "개소리 (BULLSHIT)". Before that, he also collaborated with DJ Hausk and formed the duo "Allzwell". Regardless of his music career, Loren worked a bit with modeling as well. He once posed for W of Korea and worked as a model for the brand of the designer Choi Moo-yul, Vlad Vladis.

In October 2017, there was a launch party by Italian fashion house Fendi called "F is for.." which celebrated Taeyang's collection with the brand in Hong Kong. A lot of famous people were gathered and a lot of DJs played there, one of them was also Loren. Some of them where Stephanie Cheng, Elva Ni,Venus Wong, Derek Tsang, Feiping Chang, Choice37, R. Tee, Okasian and Alisa Ueno.

2018–present: Work with BLACKPINK, solo debut and first fashion appearances

After that, Loren also took an important part on one of the biggest K-pop albums of 2020, Blackpink's The Album. He is credited as a co-lyricist on three of the eight tracks - "Pretty Savage", "You Never Know" and "Lovesick Girls". He also had a cameo appearance on the music video of "Lovesick Girls". Before participating in the music video, he also had interactions with the members and other appearances on camera. He had two studio live streams along with Rosé as a guitarist. Also, Rosé on her 25th birthday, surprised her fans by uploading on her personal Youtube channel 3 covers of songs by Coldplay, Neck Deep and Oasis, with the help of Loren playing acoustic guitar.

Loren, also has under The Black Label, his own indie record company, Fire Exit RECØRDS and as a distributor AWAL. The Black Label has noticed that he isn't a singer under the company but just a project. Also, his own company is separated. Loren has also said the meaning of the name comes from one of his tattoos on his chest which writes "LØNER". By changing the position of R and N, the two words are formed. Also, Loren's fandom is called Løners, inspired from the same tattoo. On 2020, he released his first track "Empty Trash" with the sounds of heavy rock and a taste of early 00's rock bands. On 2021, his second song "Need (ooo-eee)" was released. A post -grunge, melancholy punk pop song with an epic chorus. Made completely by Loren, the song reminds the summers of the early 00s. In the music video, Loren plays the role of a whole band, playing lead guitar, drums and bass. As he sings, the scenes switch between vocals, drumming, playing the bass or the lead guitar while he sings. Moving scenes from one set to another, the music video has a reminiscent of classic rock and roll style. The Rolling Stones of India also reports Loren as a "rising force in Korean rock as he dives into pop-punk after exploring darker strains of alternative rock on 'Empty Trash'". Later, in November 2021, he released his third song with the title "All My Friends Are Turning Blue". This time Loren isn't all alone but with a band for the first time. A fresh track with the sound being on purpose a bit unpolarized.

In February 2022, Loren also had a special appearance on the cover page of Dazed Korea's 2022 March issue with Rosé. In total, there are 8 covers, both of Rosé and Loren. Both are stylized with Yves Saint Laurent's fresh collection.He was, also, spotted at the Paris Fashion Week the same month, on Yves Saint Laurent's fashion show by Anthony Vaccarello. On April of the same year, he uploaded on his personal Instagram a photo of him alongside the logo of the fashion brand, Saint Laurent,announcing Loren as a model and representative of Saint Laurent's 2022 Eyewear Campaign. Loren was the first male solo artist from Korea chosen by the brand as a model.

In March 2023, alongside his debut EP "Put Up A Fight", it was announced that Loren had signed to recording label 88rising through which he would release his project in partnership with The Black Label.

Influences 
The music Loren makes is influenced by his favorite music styles, 90s and 00s music especially.Also, the artists he most admires are Julian Casablancas, Jack White, Damon Albarn, Liam Gallagher, Kurt Cobain and Pete Doherty Wait from rock stars.

Discography

Singles

Composition credits
All song credits are adapted from the Korea Music Copyright Association's database unless stated otherwise.

Videography

Music videos

References 

Korean musicians

Year of birth missing (living people)
Living people